As a chiefly rural and tribal population, the Pashtun dress of Afghanistan and Pakistan are typically made from light linens, and are loose fitting for ease of movement.

Pashtun men usually wear a Partūg-Kamees in Pashto (sometimes worn with a pakul or paṭkay). In the Kandahar region young men usually wear different type of hat similar to a topi and in the Peshawar region they wear white kufis instead. Leaders or tribal chiefs sometimes wear a karakul hat, like Hamid Karzai and others. The Pashtun Lūngai (or Paṭkay) is the most worn one.

The Burqa or Niqāb is sometimes worn by some Pashtun women due to cultural reasons.

See also
Pashtun culture

References

Afghan clothing
Pakistani clothing by ethnicity
History of Asian clothing
Pashtun culture
Clothing by ethnicity